Resurrecting Hassan is a Canadian documentary film, directed by Carlo Guillermo Proto and released in 2016. The documentary centres on the Hartings, a family of blind musicians in Montreal who supported themselves by busking in the Guy-Concordia station of the Montreal Metro.

The film premiered at the Montreal International Documentary Festival in November 2016.

Awards
The film was screened at the 2017 Hot Docs Canadian International Documentary Festival, where it won a Special Jury Prize.

The film received two Canadian Screen Award nominations at the 6th Canadian Screen Awards, for Best Feature Length Documentary and Best Cinematography in a Documentary (Proto). It won the Prix Iris for Best Documentary Film at the 20th Quebec Cinema Awards in 2018.

The film was shortlisted for the Prix collégial du cinéma québécois in 2018.

References

External links
 

2016 films
2016 documentary films
Canadian documentary films
Documentary films about music and musicians
Documentary films about blind people
2010s Canadian films
Best Documentary Film Jutra and Iris Award winners